Isaiah Wright (born January 13, 1997) is an American football wide receiver who is currently free agent. He was most recently a member of the Toronto Argonauts of the Canadian Football League (CFL). He played college football at Temple and was signed by the Washington Football Team of the National Football League as an undrafted free agent in 2020.

Early life and high school
Wright was born in Waterbury, Connecticut and grew up in West Hartford, Connecticut. He attended the Kingswood Oxford School, where he played wide receiver and defensive back on the football team. Wright was rated a three-star recruit and initially committed to play college football at Rutgers going into his senior year over offers from Ohio State, Wisconsin, and Maryland but changed his commitment to Temple shortly before National Signing Day.

College career
As a freshman, he rushed for 232 yards and scored one touchdown on 42 attempts while catching eight passes for 74 yards. He had 46 receptions for 668 yards and four touchdowns in his sophomore season. Wright also rushed for 188 yards and one touchdown as a wildcat quarterback and completed a pass for a two-point conversion. As a junior, he gained 368 yards and scored three touchdowns on 33 receptions and rushed for 84 yards and a touchdown while also returning 33 kickoffs for 873 yards and a touchdown and 19 punts for 249 yards and two touchdowns and was named a Sporting News First-team All-American, the AAC Special Teams Player of the Year, and First-team All-AAC. Wright caught 47 passes for 442 yards and five touchdowns in his senior season.

Professional career

Washington Football Team 
Wright was signed by the Washington Football Team as an undrafted free agent on April 28, 2020. Wright made his NFL debut on September 13, 2020 in the season opener against the Philadelphia Eagles, playing ten snaps on special teams. Two weeks later, in a game against the Cleveland Browns, he recorded the first four catches of his NFL career, for a total of 24 yards. He finished his rookie season with 27 receptions for 197 yards. On August 31, 2021, Wright was waived by Washington.

Toronto Argonauts 
On April 6, 2022 Wright signed a contract with the Toronto Argonauts of the Canadian Football League (CFL). He was released by the Argos on September 27, 2022. Wright played in five games for the Argonauts, making two receptions for 26 yards. He also returned 10 punts for 58 yards and seven kickoffs for 169 yards.

References

External links
Washington Football Team bio
Temple Owls bio
CFL bio

1997 births
Living people
American football wide receivers
People from West Hartford, Connecticut
Players of American football from Connecticut
Sportspeople from Hartford County, Connecticut
American football return specialists
Temple Owls football players
Washington Football Team players
African-American players of American football
21st-century African-American sportspeople